The London Symphony Chorus (abbreviated to LSC) is a large symphonic concert choir based in London, UK, consisting of over 150 amateur singers, and is one of the major symphony choruses of the United Kingdom.   It was formed in 1966 as the LSO Chorus to complement the work of the London Symphony Orchestra (LSO).  The LSC is today an independent self-run organisation governed by a council of nine elected representatives.  It continues to maintain a close association with the LSO but also takes part in projects with other orchestras and organisations both in the UK and abroad. The LSC performs mainly with the LSO at the Barbican Centre in London as well as appearing at other concert venues around the UK and Europe and regularly at the Avery Fisher Hall, New York.

Repertoire 
The Chorus's core repertoire consists of the major nineteenth and twentieth century orchestral choral works. The Chorus has performed and recorded works such as Elgar's The Dream of Gerontius, Mahler's Second, Third and Eighth Symphonies, Ravel's Daphnis et Chloé, Dvořák's Stabat Mater, Janáček's Glagolitic Mass, Britten's War Requiem, Beethoven's Ninth Symphony and Missa Solemnis, Berlioz's La damnation de Faust and Roméo et Juliette, Schoenberg's Gurre-Lieder, Brahms's Ein deutsches Requiem, Rossini's Stabat Mater, Stravinsky's Oedipus Rex & Symphony of Psalms, Tippett's A Child of Our Time and Verdi's Requiem.

The Chorus has also taken part in concert performances and commercial recordings of operas including Beethoven's Fidelio, Berlioz's Les Troyens and Benvenuto Cellini, Bernstein's Candide, Britten's Peter Grimes and Billy Budd, Verdi's Rigoletto, Falstaff and Otello, Wagner's Götterdämmerung and Richard Strauss's Elektra.

Notable recordings 
The London Symphony Chorus's discography consists of over 140 recordings, and many of these recordings feature collaborations with the London Symphony Orchestra. Since 2000 the LSC has taken part in productions for the orchestra's new CD label, LSO Live which launched in 2000 and specialises in recordings of live performances in front of audiences. Among works recorded by the choir are Brahms's German Requiem (LSO, André Previn 2000); Mahler's Symphony No. 8 (CBSO, Simon Rattle 2005); Mozart's Requiem (LSO, Sir Colin Davis 2008); Britten: War Requiem (LSO, Giandrea Noseda 2012); Berlioz's Requiem (LSO, Colin Davis, 2013); and Weber's Der Freischütz (LSO, Sir Colin Davis, 2013). Notable solo artists who have featured on LSC releases include Ian Bostridge, Simon Keenleyside, Felicity Palmer and Anne Sofie von Otter.

A number of LSC recordings have received awards including the following:

Conductors 

Since its creation the Chorus has worked with a number of major choir trainers including John Alldis, Arthur Oldham, Richard Hickox and Stephen Westrop. The current Chorus Director is Simon Halsey.

The London Symphony Chorus has performed with many of the leading conductors of the day including Claudio Abbado, Daniel Barenboim, Leonard Bernstein, Pierre Boulez, Colin Davis, Mark Elder, John Eliot Gardiner, Valery Gergiev, Bernard Haitink, Mariss Jansons, Charles Mackerras, Antonio Pappano, André Previn, Simon Rattle, Mstislav Rostropovich, Georg Solti and Michael Tilson Thomas.

Patrons

Past
Diana, Princess of Wales

Present
Simon Russell Beale
Howard Goodall

References

External links
 London Symphony Chorus website

Musical groups established in 1966
London choirs
London Symphony Orchestra
1966 establishments in England